James Cerretani and Joe Salisbury were the defending champions but chose not to defend their title.

Li Zhe and Gonçalo Oliveira won the title after defeating Enrique López Pérez and Hiroki Moriya 6–2, 6–1 in the final.

Seeds

Draw

References
 Main draw

Doubles
Bangkok Challenger II - Doubles
 in Thai tennis